Outer Calm, Pain Within is the debut album of the Slovak post-metal band April Weeps. It was recorded in 999th Studio in September - December 2012 and released on February 4, 2013. Physical copies of the album are limited and came with a 24 page custom booklet including lyrics created by Marius Sachticus.

Track listing

References 

2013 debut albums
April Weeps albums